Two Gun Man from Harlem is a 1938 American contemporary Western film directed by Richard C. Kahn. It was produced by Merit Pictures, distributed by Sack Amusement Enterprises and featured an all-African-American cast.

Plot summary
A man wrongly accused of murder disguises himself as a Harlem gangster known as "the Deacon", in order to bring to justice the men who framed him. He succeeds and reveals himself to the girl who loves him, and they go off to live happily ever after.  There are many cleverly comic interludes in the story.

Cast 
 Herbert Jeffrey as Bob Blake/The Deacon
 Margaret Whitten as Sally Thompson
 Clarence Brooks as John Barker
 Mantan Moreland as Bill Blake
 Stymie Beard as Jimmy Thompson
 Spencer Williams, Jr. as Butch Carter
 Mae Turner as Mrs. Ruth Steel
 Jesse Lee Brooks as Sheriff
 Rose Lee Lincoln as Dolores
 Tom Southern as John Steel
 The Cats and the Fiddle as Specialty Act
 The Four Tones as Singing Group
 Paul Blackman as Paul Blackman

Soundtrack 
 Herb Jeffries and The Four Tones - "I'm a Happy Cowboy"
 The score - "Die Walküre" (Written by Richard Wagner)

References

External links 
 
 
 
 
 

1938 films
American black-and-white films
1938 Western (genre) films
African-American Western (genre) films
Films directed by Richard C. Kahn
1930s English-language films
1930s American films